Patrick Joseph Skerry (born January 21, 1970) is the head coach of the Towson University Tigers men's basketball team.

Biography

Playing career
Skerry played collegiate basketball at Tufts University where he set the school record for career assists (634) and single-season assists (198).

Coaching career
After graduation, Skerry joined his alma mater's coaching staff, where he spent three seasons before moving on to Stonehill College for the 1995–96 season. A year later he took his first head coaching job at Curry College at the age of 26. In two seasons at the helm of the Colonials, Skerry compiled a 24–25 record.

In 1998, Skerry jumped to Northeastern University as an assistant coach for two seasons, before moving on to William & Mary (2000–03), College of Charleston (2003–05), University of Rhode Island (2005–08), Providence College (2008–10), and Pittsburgh (2010–11) before accepting the head coaching job at Towson, replacing Pat Kennedy.

Skerry's first season in charge of the Tigers saw the team go 1–31, with the lone win coming on January 28, 2012, against UNC-Wilmington, snapping the team's NCAA record 41-game losing streak. One year later, Towson went 18–13, finishing second in the Colonial Athletic Association completing the biggest single season improvement in NCAA basketball history. Despite the high finish, the Tigers were ineligible for the CAA Tournament and NCAA Tournament due to low APR scores that were earned under the previous coach, Pat Kennedy.

Head coaching record

College

References

1970 births
Living people
American men's basketball coaches
American men's basketball players
Basketball coaches from Massachusetts
Basketball players from Massachusetts
College men's basketball head coaches in the United States
College of Charleston Cougars men's basketball coaches
Curry Colonels men's basketball coaches
Northeastern Huskies men's basketball coaches
Pittsburgh Panthers men's basketball coaches
Providence Friars men's basketball coaches
Rhode Island Rams men's basketball coaches
Stonehill Skyhawks men's basketball coaches
Towson Tigers men's basketball coaches
Tufts Jumbos men's basketball coaches
Tufts Jumbos men's basketball players
William & Mary Tribe men's basketball coaches